Hjem til gården 2021 (Home to the Farm 2021) is the fifth and final season of the Danish version of The Farm. 14 contestants from across Denmark come to the farm and live like it was 100 years ago. Each week, the head of the farm nominates one person to be in a duel, the nominee then chooses who they'll face off against in one of three challenges. The person who loses the duel is sent home but not before writing a letter delivered to the farm stating who the head of farm for the next week is. The winner wins a grand prize of 500,000 kr. This year, the season was filmed on a farm in Rudegaard on the island of Falster. The season premiered on 14 March 2021 and concluded on 16 May 2021 when Simon Borch Rasmussen won in a final duel against Hanne Holdt-Simonsen to win and become the last winner of Hjem til gården.

Finishing order
All contestants entered on Day 1.

The game

Notes

References

External links

The Farm (franchise)
Danish television series